Foucaucourt-sur-Thabas is a village and a commune in the Argonne region in the Meuse department in Grand Est in north-eastern France. It is the only village in the commune. The nearest town is Sainte-Menehould, 'capital' of the Argonne, some 27 km to the northeast.

See also
Communes of the Meuse department

References

Foucaucourtsurthabas